Il dio serpente (The snake god) is a 1970 Italian erotic fantasy film directed by Piero Vivarelli and featuring Italian-based American actress Nadia Cassini in her first lead role. The film is an earlier example of voodoo (and later zombie) themed sexploitation films shot in  Colombia by Italian directors. The theme song of the film, "Djamballà" by Augusto Martelli, reached the first position in the Italian hit parade.

Plot
Paola (Cassini) is in a deteriorating marriage with Bernard (Galeazzo Bentivoglio). After the couple move to an island in the Caribbean, Paola befriends a local woman named Stella (Beryl Cunningham) who introduces her to the cult of the serpent god Djamballà. Paola, first despising the rituals of the cult, soon realises that they represent the passion and lust lacking in her married life. At a ritual where reality is interspersed within fantasy, Paola has sex with a strong black man (Evaristo Márquez) she identifies with the serpent god himself. After her husband's sudden death, she invites her former lover Tony (Sergio Tramonti) to the island to start a new life but understands that Djamballà has become her sole obsession.

Cast
 Nadia Cassini as Paola
 Beryl Cunningham as Stella
 Sergio Tramonti as Tony
 Galeazzo Bentivoglio as Bernard
 Arnoldo Palacios as Witch Man
 Juana Sobreda
 Claudio Trionfi as Priest
 Evaristo Marquez as Djamballà
 Koike Mahoco

Production
Director Piero Vivarelli said a sex scene played by Nadia Cassini wasn't simulated: "I had told Evaristo Marquez, the actor who had a torrid scene with her, to act like everything was real. And I think that's what happened. Besides, Cassini didn't mind."

References

External links

1970 films
Italian sexploitation films
1970s fantasy films
Italian fantasy films
Erotic fantasy films
Films about race and ethnicity
Adultery in films
Films set in the Caribbean
Films set on islands
Films shot in Venezuela
1970s Italian-language films
1970s Italian films